The championship round of the 2017 World Baseball Classic took place at Dodger Stadium in Los Angeles, California, from March 20 to 22, 2017. The championship round was a single-elimination tournament. Japan and the Netherlands advanced to the championship round from Pool E. Puerto Rico and the United States advanced from Pool F. Defending champions Dominican Republic were eliminated in the second round.

Puerto Rico and the Netherlands played a semifinal game on March 20, while the United States and Japan played on March 21. Puerto Rico and the United States advanced to the championship game. The United States defeated Puerto Rico to win the championship. Marcus Stroman was named the tournament's Most Valuable Player.

Bracket

Results
All times are Pacific Daylight Time (UTC−07:00).

Semifinal 1 − Puerto Rico 4, Netherlands 3

Prior to the game, Didi Gregorius was removed from the Netherlands roster due to a shoulder injury. The Netherlands gained Kenley Jansen, who did not pitch in the previous rounds. Rick van den Hurk started for the Netherlands and Jorge López started for Puerto Rico.

Wladimir Balentien and Carlos Correa both hit two-run home runs in the first inning. T. J. Rivera hit a home run for Puerto Rico in the second inning. The Netherlands tied the score on a run batted in (RBI) double by Shawn Zarraga in the fifth inning. From there, the game remained tied through the 10th inning.

Starting in the 11th inning, teams start each inning with runners on first and second base as a means of sudden death. The Netherlands failed to score in the top of the 11th inning, but Puerto Rico scored the game-winning run in the bottom of the inning.

Semifinal 2 − United States 2, Japan 1

Japan reached the semifinals with wins in all six games played in the previous rounds. Tanner Roark started for the United States in the semifinal game, while Tomoyuki Sugano started for Japan. Roark pitched four scoreless innings, while Sugano allowed one run in six innings. The United States scored a run on an RBI single by Andrew McCutchen in the fourth inning, and Ryosuke Kikuchi hit a home run for Japan in the sixth inning to tie the game. The United States scored another run in the eighth inning to take the lead, and Luke Gregerson earned the save. Though the Japanese team was considered the strongest defensive team in the WBC, misplays by Kikuchi at second base and Nobuhiro Matsuda at third base led to each of the United States's runs.

Final − United States 8, Puerto Rico 0

Puerto Rico reached the championship undefeated in the tournament, winning all seven games played. Puerto Rico defeated the United States when they faced each other in Pool F. In the championship game, Seth Lugo started for Puerto Rico, and Marcus Stroman started for the United States. Ian Kinsler hit a two-run home run for the United States in the third inning, as Puerto Rico's performance faltered without earning a single run throughout the innings. Kinsler scored again in the fifth inning on a single by Christian Yelich, and Yelich scored on an infield single by McCutchen. Two more runs scored on a bases loaded single by Brandon Crawford in the seventh inning, and Giancarlo Stanton scored the inning's third run with an RBI single. Meanwhile, Stroman did not allow a hit for the first six innings of play. The United States added another run in the eighth inning with an RBI single by McCutchen. The United States completed the shutout to win the championship. Stroman was named the tournament's Most Valuable Player.

References

External links
Official website

Championship
World Baseball Classic championship
World Baseball Classic championship
Baseball competitions in Los Angeles
International baseball competitions hosted by the United States
International sports competitions in California
World Baseball Classic championship